The Tanganyika killifish (Lamprichthys tanganicanus) is a species of poeciliid endemic to Lake Tanganyika, where it forms large schools, mainly close to rocky shores but also pelagically off shore.  This species grows to a length of  SL. It is an egglayer with external fertilization, and deposits its eggs in narrow crevices. It is fished commercially for food, and also for the aquarium trade. It has been introduced to Lake Kivu.

References

Tanganyika killifish
Fish of Lake Tanganyika
Tanganyika killifish
Taxa named by George Albert Boulenger
Taxonomy articles created by Polbot